The Botswana Prison Service (BPS) is the corrections agency of Botswana. It holds pre-trial and convicted prisoners.

Prisons
Kanye Prison (Kanye)
Letlhakane Prison (Letlhakane)
Lobatse Prison (Lobatse)
Machaneng Prison (Machaneng)
Mahalapye Prison (Mahalapye)
Mochudi Prison (Mochudi)
Molepolole Prison (Molepolole)
Selebi Phikwe Prison (Selebi-Phikwe)
Serowe New Prison (Serowe)
Tsabong Prison(Tsabong)
First Offenders Prison (Gaborone)
Boro Prison (Boro)
Ghanzi Prison (Ghanzi)
Moshupa Boys Prison (Moshupa)
Gaborone Maximum Prison (Gaborone)
Gaborone Women's Prison (Gaborone)
Tshane Prison (Tshane)
Francistown Prison (Francistown)
Maun Prison (Maun)

References

Further reading
 Social Work in the Botswana Prison Service. Botswana Prisons Dept., 1983.

External links

Letsatle, Keamogetse. "RESOURCE MATERIAL SERIES No.84 PARTICIPANTS' PAPERS COMMUNITY INVOLVEMENT IN OFFENDER TREATMENT COUNTRY REPORT – BOTSWANA." p. 154-160
"Reflections from Prison." (Archive) Kutlwano. August 2012. Volume 50, Issue 8.

Government agencies of Botswana
Prison and correctional agencies